The 2018 Solihull Metropolitan Borough Council election took place on 3 May 2018 to elect members of Solihull Metropolitan Borough Council in England. This was on the same day as other local elections.

Council Results

Ward Results

Bickenhill

Blythe

Castle Bromwich

Chelmsley Wood

Dorridge and Hockley Heath

Elmdon

Kingshurst and Fordbridge

Knowle

Lyndon

Meriden

Olton

St Alphege

Shirley East

Shirley South

Shirley West

Silhill

Smiths Wood

References

2018 English local elections
2018
2010s in the West Midlands (county)